Statistics of UAE Football League in season 1979/80.

Overview
Al-Ahli Football Club - Dubai won the championship.

References
United Arab Emirates - List of final tables (RSSSF)

UAE Pro League seasons
1
Emir